Highway 938 is a provincial highway in the Canadian province of Saskatchewan. It runs from Highway 917 to a dead end. Highway 938 is about 7 km (4 mi.) long.

See also 
Roads in Saskatchewan
Transportation in Saskatchewan

References 

938